The Night Angel Trilogy is a fantasy series written by Brent Weeks. The story follows the life of Azoth (later Kylar Stern) as he struggles as a guild rat to become the ultimate wetboy (an assassin with magical talent, such as the ability to muffle sound or to block an attack), but then tries to leave it all behind and finally becomes the avatar of retribution: the Night Angel.

Series
 The Way of Shadows
 Shadow's Edge
 Beyond the Shadows
 Prequel: The Perfect Shadow

Characters in the series

Setting
The story is set on the continent of Midcyru, mainly in the country of Cenaria and in its capital city which shares the same name.

Magic

The Talent
The Talent is the magic most commonly used in Midcyru. Talented individuals must have three different components to be able to express their Talent outwardly. The first is their Glore Vyrden, or life magic. This is the reserve that stores the power that can be directed as the user wishes. The second component is the ability to refill one's glore vyrden when it is empty - if one does not possess it, then one can use magic only once or twice during one's whole life. A person with such an ability usually replenishes the glore vyrden by absorbing sunlight or light from other sources. The final component is a conduit allowing the use of one's glore vyrden however one desires. This conduit can be small or blocked, limiting the maximum amount of magic one can use at a single time. A nonexistent conduit, large glore vyrden and the ability to absorb large amounts of energy through the skin and eyes are the signs of a ka'karifer, one ready to bond and use the ka'kari artifacts. Also, people who are ka'karifers can call out to ka'kari, but once they bond, they cannot do so anymore.

Magus and Maja

In the series, a male mage is called a Magus, with Magi as its plural form. A Maja is a female mage, with Magae as its plural form.

Red Magi
Red Magi tend to use fire magic. Solonariwan Tofusin is a Sethi red mage in line for the throne and is very Talented, considered to be one of the strongest red mages of his time.

Green Magi
Green Magi are healers. Dorian Ursuul trained with the Green Magi in an attempt to use healing magic to possibly save him from the inevitable madness that afflicts all prophets, achieving the rank of Hoth'Salar (Brother of Healing).

Brown Magi
Also known as the Makers, the Brown Magi specialize in the creation of magical artifacts. Feir Cousat is an example of a Brown Mage.

Ka'karifers
Ka'karifers are those who use a ka'kari. These people have no conduit for their Talent, but the ka'kari provides them with one if they bond with one of the seven. In this case, a ka'karifer is someone who calls a ka'kari. However, if the ka'kari ever leaves the ka'karifer, as in the case of Durzo Blint, the conduit remains. Known ka'karifers include:
 Arikus Daadrul
 Corvaer Blackwell
 Trace Arvagulania
 Oren Razin
 Irenaea Blochwei
 Shrad Marden
 Acaelus Thorne/Durzo Blint
 Kylar Stern/Azoth

Vir
The vir is used by Meisters, Vürdmeisters and the Ursuul family. Vir users are also referred to as wytches, though this term insults them. The prayer that the Khalidorians say to their goddess is actually a spell that empties a small portion of their glore vyrden into her "reservoir" of magic; she then returns however much she desires back to them as vir. Like the Talent, it can act as an extension of the physical being. The difference between vir and Talent is that the vir is living, and has a measure of sentience, mostly because it is part of Khali. Many Meisters and Vürdmeisters who find themselves in harm's way will be protected by it unintentionally. It is described as a magical parasite. It opens new channels in the user's Talent, so initially a vir user will have stronger Talent, but the vir eventually consumes all the user's Talent permanently.

A Meister's or Vürdmeister's strength in the vir is measured in shu'ra. There are thirteen shu'ra; however, only the Godking can attain the thirteenth. The vir appears on a Meister as a black, living tattoo of vines on the body of a Meister. The strength of a Meister's vir is shown by the amount of vir on his or her body, and the intricacy of the tattoos represents his or her mastery of the vir. Usually only the wytch's arms show vir, but stronger vir users, such as Dorian and Garoth Ursuul, are almost completely covered in vir when they choose to display it. The Ursuuls are the only Meisters who can hide their vir and bring it to the surface of their bodies at will. According to Neph Dada, the Ursuuls are also capable of removing access to the vir from another wytch. Curoch also has the power to destroy the vir contained in a wytch's body and does so in a small but violent concussive explosion. The Ursuul family's hidden vir can be stopped by stopping the physical expression of it, which appears to be the only weakness of their ability to hide their vir. While the Ursuuls can control the vir and who is able to use it, Khali controls the reservoir of vir and talent, which allows her to decide the level of a wytch's power.

Meisters
Meisters are the lowest rank and most common users of the vir, and they are never above the tenth shu'ra. They usually do not display much of the vir on their arms or the rest of their bodies. All ranking officials in Khalidor are at least Meisters, but most offices do not appear to take strength into great consideration. For example, Godking Wanhope's Keeper of the Dead is only a meister of the third shu'ra.

Vürdmeisters
Vürdmeisters are more powerful meisters. To become a Vürdmeister, a meister must pass at least the 10th shu'ra. Vürdmeisters are able to effectuate summons, such as the Pit Wyrm, while most meisters appear not to be able to. Neph Dada is a Vürdmeister.

Magical artifacts

Ka'kari
Created by Ezra the Mad, based on the Black ka'kari that he discovered, and given to the Six Champions. They are described as glowing, metallic balls. When the user desires, the ka'kari covers their body like a second skin and gives them power over a specific element. This is activated by crushing said metallic ball which becomes a liquid and then covers the body. They also grant the user immortality, although they can still be killed in a way unaffiliated with the powers of their ka'kari. For example, while the bearer of the silver ka'kari is completely impervious to blades and metal weapons, he or she could easily be drowned or burned to death. The only known way of completely destroying a ka'kari is with the sword Curoch, as demonstrated by Kylar's destruction of the white ka'kari. However, while discussing the ka'kari with Garoth Ursuul, Neph Dada states that he believes a high amount of elemental power could be used to damage the ka'kari, and that this may have happened to the red and blue ka'kari.

Black Ka'kari
The original ka'kari, found by Ezra. He tried to replicate it but was only able to make inferior copies. Not much is known about it, but it is ancient and extremely powerful. It is sentient in nature, able to engage in small talk with Kylar and Durzo, as well as offer them advice. Furthermore, it also has a sarcastic sense of humor, similar to Durzo's, presumably from spending seven hundred years with him. The black ka'kari, like all ka'kari, chooses its user. The black ka'kari chose Acaleus Thorne and Kylar Stern because of their love of companionship, as the black ka'kari's abilities are based on love. It chose Acaelus Thorne over Ezra and Jorsin Alkestes, as Acaelus lived for the brotherhood shared in battle. After Durzo chose to let Vonda, a woman he was involved with die, the ka'kari abandoned him, as his ability to love was gone. It is known as the Devourer and the Sustainer; it devours everything it touches, including magic, items or clothing, except for the bearer (And certain rare magical items such as Iures the Staff of Law, and Curoch the Sword of Power). The black ka'kari allows the bearer to become perfectly invisible to everyone except mages. It is also able to bring the bearer back to life after being killed. In doing so, the sacrifice of new life is ending another's, this person being someone the bearer loved, either as friend or loved one. This death is not immediate, but it is imminent. It is also a known fact that whoever is the wielder of the Black Ka'kari is known as the Night Angel who serves Vengeance, Justice, and Mercy culminating as the Avatar of Retribution.

The black ka'kari's powers are vast and while most of them have been explained several of them are not.  Its other abilities are: accelerated healing, the ability to see through shadows, the ability to dissipate a talent users weaves and(or) talent {"...she gathered her full strength; he blew in her face. Her Talent scattered as if that puff had been a hurricane..." Kylar confronting Istariel in her office}, the ability to see into the magical spectrum, the ability to see the Coranti {the unclean - sins or injustices that a person has committed}, and to transfer any thing it devours to its bearer as magical energy to restore their glore vyrden.  Of these powers; accelerated healing and the ability to see through shadows remain to the user whether he is in possession of the ka'kari or not.  It is unclear as to what powers remain to the a person whom the ka'kari abandons, but it could be speculated that the ability to see through shadows remains as Durzo has never had a problem navigating through a place of total darkness; even after the ka'kari had abandoned him as is evident from him easily moving through the tunnels to the nine's meeting spot without the use of a light source and there is no point when Durzo takes enough harm to tell if he still has the benefit of the accelerated healing though due to one having the ability while not in possession of the ka'kari would suggest that he does.

Silver Ka'kari
Originally given to Arikus (Eric according to the latest released novella "Perfect Shadow") Daadrul. Once bonded, the silver ka'kari makes the user impervious to blades and other metals. The Globe of Edges in Cenaria was thought to be the silver ka'kari, but was a forgery. This could be the item that Garoth Ursuul wanted but is never made specific. The current location of the silver ka'kari remains unknown.

Red Ka'kari
Originally given to Corvaer Blackwell, also known as Corvaer the Red. Once bonded, the red ka'kari gives the user power over fire. It was hidden inside Mount Tenji by Durzo Blint in an attempt to keep it away from the Wolf. This action turned Mount Tenji into an active volcano.

White Ka'kari
Originally given to Trace Avagulania. Once bonded, the white ka'kari gives the user the power of glamour. Glamour being defined as a weave to give the bearer an illusion to others, and in this case, the glamour of the white ka'kari was so powerful that it could be used to create an irresistible compulsion in others. Trace, reputed to be horribly ugly, became the most beautiful woman ever seen. Using the power given to her by the ka'kari, she became the Khalidorian goddess Khali. This ka'kari was destroyed when Kylar used Curoch to kill Khali.

Brown Ka'kari
Originally given to Oren Razin. Once bonded, the brown ka'kari gives the user power over the earth. The user can become a thousand-pound brute with skin made of stone. A much younger Durzo Blint gave it to the Wolf before deciding he needed to keep the artifacts safe from the Wolf.

Green Ka'kari
Originally given to Irenaea Blochwei. Once bonded, the green ka'kari gives the user power over plant life. It is believed to be somewhere in Ladesh. However, it is possible that this ka'kari was thrown into Ezra's wood, as Durzo states he threw two ka'kari into the wood, and all other ka'kari are accounted for.

Blue Ka'kari
Originally given to Shrad Marden. Once bonded, the blue ka'kari gives the user power over water. It also is said to allow the user to drain the liquid from a man's blood. It was thrown into the ocean by Durzo Blint, which created the Tlaxini Maelstrom.

Iures (The Staff of Law)
Created by Jorsin Alkestes and Ezra the day before Jorsin's demise, it is the companion to Curoch. Iures differs from Curoch in that it grants no additional power, but instead allows the wielder to focus his or her power to an extreme degree, allowing them to create or undo extremely complicated weaves with ease. It also has the power to record any weaves created near it and it remembers those weaves forever. Like Curoch, the wielder can also change Iures' appearance and shape at will. Durzo Blint and Kylar both use Iures disguised as the sword Retribution. The location of Iures is not explicitly stated at the end of the trilogy, but it is highly likely that the Dark Hunter has it in Ezra's Wood.

Ceur'caelestos (The Blade of Heaven)
Ceur'caelestos, or Blade of Heaven, is the Ceuran's legendary sword. Ceuran Law states that the bearer of the Blade of Heaven is King of Ceura. The sword is made of pure mistarille. There is a dragon on each side of the blade with a gap at the mouth, from which fire is produced whenever danger or magic is near. On the hilt there is a mark of two crossed war hammers. The hilt also contains a very large and pure red ruby. It first appears when Feir is running from Lantano Garuwashi and he has to confront him with Curoch. Curoch takes on the appearance of this blade (and it is suggested that Curoch, through its inherent shapeshifting abilities, may very well be the original Ceur'caelestos), and Lantano Garuwashi subsequently takes it from Feir. Kylar then steals the blade and throws it into Ezra's Wood. Feir enters the Wood to retrieve it, and receives instructions on how to recreate Ceur'caelestos. He then travels to Black Barrow and forges a perfect replica of the sword; save for Feir hiding his own smithing symbol near the base of the blade, which he gives to Garuwashi. However, the replica does not breathe fire like the original, as Feir cannot find a ruby to bind the necessary magic into. Immediately before the inspection of the sword by a Ceuran mage, Solon brings a suitable ruby to Garuwashi, completing the sword in truth, and causing it to gain the ability to breathe fire. The inspection reveals Feir's symbol, which according to the document is supposed to be on the blade.  Thus, Ceur'caelestos existed only as a legend before Feir forged it.

Curoch (The Blade of Power)
Created by Jorsin Alkestes and Ezra, Curoch is the partner blade to Iures. Like Iures, Curoch can take any form that the bearer wishes, as Neph Dada demonstrated in the Hall of Winds. However, while Iures gives the bearer greater control over magic (allowing them to create or undo weaves with greater precision) Curoch amplifies the bearer's power to an extreme degree. With the vast majority of mages, this amplification exceeds what the bearer's body can handle, with only the strongest mages in the trilogy being capable of handling Curoch even at its lowest levels of power. The two best examples of Curoch's power are when Solon Tofusin used it to kill all the meisters using their vir during Roth's coup in Cenaria, when Jorsin Alkestes used it to blow apart the magic that was giving the krul form in the Alkestian Cycle (an era predating the time in which the Trilogy is set), and when Kylar uses Curoch to kill Neph Dada, euthanise Elene, and kill Khali, who was possessing her at the time. Curoch is also responsible for the destruction of the vir as it destroyed Khali, the goddess who supplied the vir to the Khalidorians. Curoch is the blade that Lantano Garuwashi originally believed to be the Blade of Heaven.

Although the dark hunter appears to have taken Curoch at the end of the final book, it was prophesied by Dorian that there is one meant to wield Curoch, but this person has yet to come. This could refer to a child of Kylar and Elene, as it is implied that Dorian magically transferred the child from Elene to Jenine before her death. However, it could also refer to a child of Dorian and Jenine, as this would be a child of the only true Prophet, the most powerful Healer of the age, and the High Queen. Also, as mentioned by the author, there will be a series set seventeen years after the events of Beyond The Shadows.

Curoch is also the only weapon known that is able to truly kill the bearer of the Black Ka'kari. Black Ka'kari to Kylar "...By the way, Jorsin Alkestes didn't like the idea of his enemies coming back to life.  If that sword kills you, you're really dead."

Politics

Legitimate rulers

High King
The prophesied king to become ruler of all Midcryu. He was born on a special day and has the mark of a moon dragon on his arm (what the mark is was ambiguous in the prophecy.  The other contender simply had a tattoo on his arm). Logan Gyre assumes the title of High King, becoming the overlord of Khalidor, Lodricar, Cenaria and Ceura.

Godking
The ruler of Khalidor from the Ursuul bloodline. Godkings are the only meisters capable of reaching the thirteenth shu'ra. They have a high degree of control over the vir and are able to rip out the vir of other meisters.

Royal titles
Most of Midcyru's countries are monarchies ruled by kings (Cenaria, Friaku), queens (Waeddryn), emperors (Seth) or regents (Ceura). Or the Godking in Khalidor.

Criminal Underworld

Sa'kagé (The Lord Of Shadow) 
The Sa'kagé are the criminal underworld of various cities across Midcyru, the most powerful and evident one being Cenaria's and the least powerful being in Caernarvon. It is represented inconographically by an eye with a heavy lid drawn in one complete gesture. In Cenaria they control all of the crime in the city, including the prostitution, smuggling, assassinations, the guilds, etc. In the first book Durzo Blint is also controlled by the Cenarian Sa'kage. They are also the reason that Khalidor didn't invade Cenaria straight away, the Sa'Kage controlled everything, and the royalty controlled next to nothing, Khalidor wanted to control the Sa'Kage to allow them to take Cenaria in a single attack.
The word "Kagé" means the Shadow. Sa'kagé means Lords of the Shadow. Originally part of an oath Acaelus Thorne gave to Jorsin Alkestes, who claimed that the oath was as old as the Night Angels themselves, the term Sa'Kage has been stolen by the criminals who run Cenaria and are in every other country (apparently except for Ymmur although it has not been mentioned) in a bid to tell people that they were the lords of the night and not the night angels

Shinga
The Shinga is the head of the Sa'kagé, and is iconographically represented by a nine-pointed star. Momma K was the Cenarian Shinga for over fifteen years, hiding behind various puppet Shingas to keep her identity a secret. She gave up her title to Jarl, who declared himself Shinga and was supported by Momma K. Consequently, many of those who knew the identity of the real Shinga thought Jarl was only another puppet. 
After Jarl's assassination, Momma K assumes the role of Shinga again, while conspiring with Logan Gyre to get rid of the Sa'kagé at the same time.

The Nine
The council to the Cenarian Shinga, consisting of the nine most important Sa'kagé members. The Nine and the wetboys are the only people who know the true Shinga's identity. While it is intimated that each of the nine has an actual title, not all of the titles or positions they hold are put forth. The Master of Coin (a position held at one point by Count Drake) and the Mistress of Pleasures (Momma K) are explicitly named, but some of the others are only mentioned in accordance with their duties. A smuggling master is mentioned (he was killed by Durzo), Corbin Fishill was said to be the head of the children's guilds (also killed by Durzo), and another man was said to be the head of the bashers (although no name was given).

Wetboys
"Wetboys are to assassins like a tiger is to a kitten." - Kylar

"That's why assassins have targets. Wetboys have deaders. Why do we call them deaders? Because when we take a contract, the rest of their short lives is a formality." - Durzo

Wetboys are unparalleled killers, the elite of the elite when it comes to assassination in Cenaria. While assassins and assassination in general are commonplace in Cenaria, what distinguishes the true wetboys is not their improved skill at hiding, sneaking, killing, or any of these things. They may be more talented at killing, but what actually makes the distinction is that the true wetboys (Durzo Blint, Scarred Wrable, Hu Gibbet, Anders Gurka, and Jonus Severing are named) have the Talent: magical ability that greatly enhances their prowess in different ways. In general, the Talent enhances their physical abilities to an extreme degree, but it also allows them to do things like bend light to hide in the shadows, create phantom limbs for attack or defense, and cling to vertical surfaces, to name a few. Durzo displays a far greater range of abilities than any of the others, but his Talent was correspondingly more powerful than nearly any of the other characters shown in the series, along with the nearly 700 years of knowledge and experience he had to work with.

While the wetboys in the series tend to be loyal only to themselves and to the contracts they are paid to perform, their Talent allows them to swear a magically binding oath to the Shinga, something they are compelled to do early on. This is a safety measure for the Shinga, for as Durzo puts it: "Shingas who aren't paranoid don't live very long." The oath and corresponding magical compulsion are relatively weak, but to remove it entirely the wetboy would have to submit themselves to a mage (every mage in Cenaria is under the control of the Sa'Kage) or a meister (Durzo again: "...only an idiot would submit to a meister"). Thus, the extreme danger the wetboys present is somewhat balanced.  However, Kylar and Durzo are the only two wetboys never made to swear this oath.

Religion

The Hundred Gods
Most peoples of Midcyru believe in the Hundred Gods or at least in some of them. Priests to the Hundred Gods are called hecatonarchs.

Nysos is the deity of potent liquids, including blood, wine, and semen. He is often worshipped by wetboys and is likely derived from the Greek Dionysos, who holds a similar position in the Greek pantheon.

The One God
The One God is never referred to as being the god of any particular religion, and characters throughout the series that worship The One God are also never referred to as being part of any particular religion. The One God's name affirms that it is a Monotheist religion. There are similarities that The One God shares with the God that is worshiped in many religions today. (Particularly the Christian God, as Elene once spoke from actual scripture that is located in the Holy Bible.) The One God is also referred to many times as just "God". In one section of the novel, Godking Wanhope appears to have a short argument with The One God, possibly validating his existence in the story. However, this argument could simply be seen as a sign of Wanhope's decaying mental state.

Khali
Worshipped by the people of Khalidor. Dorian believed that she was a fallen angel who roamed the earth. It turns out that Khali is Trace, the bearer of the white ka'kari; however, the relation between Khali and the Strangers isn't totally clear. Dorian said that Khali was just an ally of the strangers. Trace may have allied herself with one of the Strangers when Durzo used the black ka'kari's magic to kill her. Khali uses the power of the Ka'kari's compulsion powers to control Khalidor and others.

Vürdmeisters' summoning magic
There are many creatures that are only created by Vurdmeisters.

Ferali

A Ferali is a fearsome and terrible creature created from the bodies and souls of tortured prisoners and controlled with diamonds thrust into its "back". A ferali has the ability to absorb living creatures into its body and use the bones and tissue to become larger and more powerful. It is covered in mouths that will trap and consume a victim alive after even the slightest contact. A ferali is not bound to one shape but can change to any shape it pleases as to use the bones more effectively. When a ferali is created then the creator must host a stranger. Garoth Ursuul hosts two strangers, Lust and Pride. They are fearsome in battle as most magic is simply deflected and any wound heals instantly. A ferali can be "ridden" or possessed by a powerful user of vir and used against his enemies. If a ferali is not consuming others it will consume itself, and eventually die. Two of the Ferali in the Trilogy are Tatts and Lily, both prisoners from the deepest level of the Maw, the Hole. Kylar Stern loses an arm to a ferali before it is killed. Although the ferali is impervious to most magic, a powerful spell of a complicated weave is capable of destroying the negatory magic they seem to possess. An example of this is when Dorian, a magi skilled with complicated weaves, destroyed a ferali with one spell that took only several seconds to create. It is also susceptible to the powers of the Devourer—the Black Ka'kari—which if used to attack the Ferali will negate its ability to heal itself.

Krul

Krul are created by binding the spirit of demons known as Strangers into human bones. A krul is like a zombie in that it doesn't feel pain or fear and can be raised again after being killed, however, a krul needs to eat to sustain its energy. The bones do not have to be in human shape, however, and many krul have been created by placing human bones into the shape of a horse or dog. This is more difficult, however, because they wish to be in the form of a human, not an animal. Then, if they are given clay and water, they can form muscle, flesh, and ligaments around the bones. Once they are formed, they become living beings. They eat, they sleep, and they defecate. They do not feel as other creatures do.

Krul can speak, but not very well. They can see better in the dark, but they cannot see as far, presumably because eyes are difficult to create. As such they are poor archers. While they can feel fear, they almost never do because they know that if their physical body dies that they will most likely be remade sometime in the future. A krul is almost perfectly obedient. They have a powerful hate toward the living, powerful enough that it overrides their sense of self-preservation. If a krul is locked in a room with a person, and are told that if they kill the person that they will die as well, the krul will always choose to kill and die in turn. This was carried out with both men and women, even children. The krul cannot create anything, even weapons of war. They only exist to destroy. They eat human flesh, and it seems to make them stronger.

The Strangers use a base 13 number system, and it confines the krul to a certain order. A meister can lead 12 krul himself, but to lead 13, he must master a white krul called daemon. Daemons are fast, over 6 feet tall, and take more magic to create. 13 krul form a squad. A platoon is composed of 13 squads, or 169 krul and therefore 13 daemons. To control the 13 daemons a bone lord must be raised. The bone lords speak well, they possess more intelligence, and they can used talent-based magic. 13 bone lords make a legion, to control a legion a fiend must be raised. 13 fiends make an army, which is 28,561 krul. To lead an army, the raising of an arcanghul is necessary. To lead 13 armies, a Night Lord must be raised. It is said that with a Night Lord, Khalidor conquered most of the Freeze. Legend says that when Roygaris Ursuul had raised 13 Night Lords, slaughtering almost 5 million people, Khali came into the world.

Ferozi

Yet another foul creature that can be conjured by meisters, the ferozi are only mentioned by name. Presumably less powerful than the ferali, it is mentioned that the ferozi can breed with one another so there must be genders of ferozi

Titan

A Titan is a huge creature possessed by a Stranger. Like krul, Titans can be raised over and over by meisters. Titans look like blue-skinned men from the front, with huge leathery wings, spikes along their spine, and a rat-like tail. In battle, they are surrounded by Red strangers referred to as fire ants or buulgari or the bugs. The Fire ants fight with very sophisticated techniques.

Pit wyrm

A pit wyrm can be summoned by a Vürdmeister of sufficient power. The wyrm is preceded by a small white flying homunculus which is released on the target. After several seconds, the fabric of space is ripped apart and the wyrm appears to devour the homunculus and anything around it. The wyrm itself is difficult to destroy as its skin seems to be impervious to normal weapons and it moves rapidly and fiercely, however, the homunculus can be misdirected so that the wyrm doesn't do the intended damage. A direct confrontation between pit wyrm and ferali at Pavvil's Grove has shown that a grown-out ferali can defeat a pit wyrm; a ferali can defeat almost any other 'creature' in midcyru. Lantano Garuwashi also uses Curoch to cut a pit wyrm in half.

Novels by Brent Weeks
Fantasy novel trilogies
Fiction about invisibility